Rabindranath Tagore International Institute of Cardiac Sciences (RTIICS), also known as Rabindranath Tagore Hospital, in Mukundapur, Kolkata, West Bengal, India, is a multispeciality, tertiary care unit of Narayana Health group. It is a 681-bedded NABH accredited multi-super-speciality quaternary care hospital established in the year 2000. RTIICS has 16 fully equipped operation theatres, 4th Generation Da Vinci Robot, and four state-of-the-art Catheterisation laboratories with 24-hour emergency facilities. RTIICS provides services not only to the people of West Bengal and the neighbouring states in Eastern India and Northeastern India, it is a global healthcare hub catering to patients from countries such as Bangladesh, Bhutan, Myanmar, Nepal as well as African countries. It is equipped with clinical and technical expertise proven over time. The institute has set benchmarks in providing quaternary care services in Cardiac Surgery, Heart Transplants, LVAD, Interventional Cardiology, Pacemaker and Device Therapy, Electro Physiology and Preventive Cardiology.

History
RTIICS is the group's main hospital in Eastern India, with a primary catchment area of Kolkata. The hospital also treats patients from neighbouring districts, North-Eastern states as well as from neighbouring countries and continents such as Bangladesh, Nepal, Bhutan, Africa and Myanmar.

RTIICS, a unit of Asia Heart Foundation, was established in April 2000 by Dr. Devi Prasad Shetty, founder and chairman of Narayana Health. Early in 2016, RTIICS announced the establishment of ‘Stride’, a clinical centre offering multidisciplinary care for vascular diseases and traumas. Apart from vascular surgery, Stride is supported by an endocrinologist, radiologist, physiotherapist, counselor and other specialists.

Specialization
It specialises in cardiology, neurology, neurosurgery, nephrology and urology.

Awards
Best Hospital in Eastern India for Cardiac Sciences & Services
 Times Leading Cardiac Care & Services

See also 
 Narayana Health

References

External links
Official Website

2014 establishments in West Bengal
Heart disease organizations
Narayana Health
Hospitals in Kolkata
Hospitals in West Bengal
Hospitals in India